Rumble is the second album by the American rock band Tommy Conwell and the Young Rumblers, released in 1988. It was the band's first album for a major label.

The album peaked at No. 103 on the Billboard Top Pop Albums chart. "I'm Not Your Man" peaked at No. 1 on the Billboard Album Rock Tracks chart.

Production
The album was produced by Rick Chertoff. The fellow Philadelphia band the Hooters worked on the album; Jules Shear helped write two songs. Rumble contains four rerecordings of songs that appeared on the band's independent debut album.

Critical reception

The Washington Post called Conwell "a likable roots-rocker who turns out energetic bar-band music, and the attempt to turn him into something else is misguided at best." The Philadelphia Inquirer determined that "Chertoff, perhaps mindful of the hit-singles potential of some of these songs, might have clipped the engaging guitarist too close to the vest in a few spots, denying Rumble'''s audience the chance to experience an inventive guitar voice." The St. Petersburg Times deemed the album "a savage, blues-based, booze-soaked rock 'n' roll romp that proves a bar band can graduate to major-label status without letting corporate pressure douse its fiery conviction."The Boston Globe wrote that Rumble "has a few simplistic rock anthems, but comes alive in its striking ability to merge blues and rock with a near-gospel fire." The Toronto Star concluded that "rootsy and real as the music is, it's just a little too contrived." Comparing Conwell to Bruce Springsteen, The Gazette opined that the frontman needed to develop more "vision, if he hopes to proceed beyond Stray Cats-bar band status." The Chicago Sun-Times thought that "Rumble sometimes sounds like the vinyl equivalent of a Brat Pack film, one of the better ones."

AllMusic called "I'm Not Your Man" "as great a roots rocker as the late '80s produced, and reason enough for the group to get its shot at the big time." The Chicago Tribune listed Rumble'' as one of the 20 best albums of 1988.

Track listing

References

1988 albums
Columbia Records albums